Paul Ziffren (July 18, 1913 – May 1991) was an American sports administrator.

Education
Ziffren was a graduate of the Northwestern University School of Law.

Career
During his career, he chaired the Democratic National Committee of California.

In 1984, he was the chairman of the board of Summer Olympics. For his contributions to sports, he was inducted in the International Jewish Sports Hall of Fame.

References

1913 births
1991 deaths
American sports executives and administrators
International Jewish Sports Hall of Fame inductees
Northwestern University Pritzker School of Law alumni